Marcos dos Santos Moraes (born 21 January 1991), commonly known as Marquinhos, Markinhos or even Markisio, is a Brazilian footballer who plays as an attacking midfielder for Lebanese club Riada Wal Adab.

Club chronology
 Vasco da Gama – from October 2010 to September 2013
 America (RJ) (loan from Vasco da Gama) – from December 2011 to April 2012
 Gloria Progresul Bistrița (loan from Vasco da Gama) – from May 2012 to June 2013
 Paulista – from November 2013 to 1 February 2014
 Juventus da Mooca – from 1 February 2014 to 25 June 2014

External links

1991 births
Living people
Brazilian footballers
ACF Gloria Bistrița players
Liga I players
Association football midfielders